is a Japanese politician serving in the House of Representatives in the Diet (national legislature) as a member of the Liberal Democratic Party. He is a native of Tarō, Iwate and attended a graduate school at Waseda University. He was elected for the first time in 1976 as an independent after unsuccessful runs in 1969 and 1972.

From 1994 to 1995 he was Director General of the Japan Defense Agency.

In May 2008 Tamazawa was awarded the Order of Brilliant Star with Grand Cordon from President Chen Shui-bian as recognition for the work he has done to foster relations between China and Japan.

References

External links
 

Living people
1937 births
Liberal Democratic Party (Japan) politicians
Members of the House of Representatives (Japan)
Japanese defense ministers
Waseda University alumni
21st-century Japanese politicians